The 1938 Missouri Tigers football team was an American football team that represented the University of Missouri in the Big Six Conference (Big 6) during the 1938 college football season. The team compiled a 6–3 record (2–3 against Big 6 opponents), finished in a tie for third place in the Big 6, and outscored all opponents by a combined total of 111 to 82. Don Faurot was the head coach for the fourth of 19 seasons. The team played its home games at Memorial Stadium in Columbia, Missouri.

The team's leading scorer was Paul Christman with 48 points.

Schedule

References

Missouri
Missouri Tigers football seasons
Missouri Tigers football